Christine Hennion (born 23 August 1955) is a French politician of La République En Marche! (LREM) who has been serving as a member of the French National Assembly between 2017 elections and 2022 representing the department of Hauts-de-Seine.

Political career
In parliament, Hennion serves as member of the Committee on Economic Affairs and the Committee on European Affairs. In addition to her committee assignments, she is a member of the French-Japanese Parliamentary Friendship Group. Since 2019, she has also been a member of the French delegation to the Franco-German Parliamentary Assembly. In July 2019, Hennion voted in favor of the French ratification of the European Union’s Comprehensive Economic and Trade Agreement (CETA) with Canada.

See also
 2017 French legislative election

References

1955 births
Living people
Deputies of the 15th National Assembly of the French Fifth Republic
La République En Marche! politicians
21st-century French women politicians
People from Roubaix
Women members of the National Assembly (France)
Members of Parliament for Hauts-de-Seine
University of Lille Nord de France alumni